Beautiful Death Machine is the tenth studio album by Canadian hip-hop group Swollen Members. The album was released on March 19, 2013, by Suburban Noize Records and Battle Axe Records.

Commercial performance
The album debuted at number 167 on the Billboard 200 chart, with first-week sales of 3,000 copies in the United States.

Track listing

Charts

References

2013 albums
Swollen Members albums
Suburban Noize Records albums